Mountains named Granite Peak or variations.

Canada 
In Canada, according to NRCan CGNDB:

United States 
In the United States, according to USGS GNIS:

See also
Granite Mountain (disambiguation)
Granite Mountains (disambiguation)